Victor Villarreal is an American musician and songwriter, best known for his role as guitarist in Cap'n Jazz, Owls and Joan of Arc. His music incorporates elements of classical, indie and emo, and contains surreal guitar solos and instrumentals.

Biography
Villarreal took up the guitar at the age of 12, and played in several bands with Tim Kinsella, his childhood friend. They performed as Cap'n Jazz, Owls and Joan of Arc. Villarreal also had Joan of Arc bassist Erik Bocek perform in Villarreal's own group, Ghosts and Vodka. Having worked at a dog hospital, Villarreal later started a dog-training program called "Everything Canine." Villarreal returned to making music after his brother died, releasing the albums, "Sleep Talk" and "Invisible Cinema" through Joyful Noise Recordings in Indianapolis.

Villarreal often features cantaloupes in his music and album artwork. He has also said that he's influenced by Iron Maiden and Rush.

Bands and projects
1989–1995 Cap'n Jazz
1996–1997 Flashlight
1998–2001 Ghosts and Vodka
2001–2002, 2012 Owls
2003 Noyes
2011 Joan of Arc (band)
2012–present Victor Villarreal (solo projects)

Discography
2015: "Sleep Talk" – Victor Villarreal, released on Joyful Noise Recordings
2014: "Two" - Owls 
2012: Joan of Arc  − Joan of Arc
2012: Presents: Pine Cone  − Joan of Arc 
2012: The Formal Listening Series Compilation − Victor Villarreal
2012: Split 7" with mOck − Victor Villarreal, released on Joyful Noise Recordings
2012: Presents: Joan of Arc − Joan Of Arc
2012: Invisible Cinema − Victor Villarreal, released on Joyful Noise Recordings
2011: Life Like − Joan of Arc, released on Joyful Noise Recordings
2010: Eating Happens 7" − Victor Villarreal
2009: Alive − Victor Villarreal
2003: Addicts and Drunks − Ghosts and Vodka
2003: Noyes EP − Noyes
2003: Chicago Punk Refined Compilation − Owls
2001: Owls − Owls
2001: Precious Blood − Ghosts and Vodka
1999: Momento Mori EP − Ghosts and Vodka
1998: Analphabetapolothology − Cap'n Jazz
1996: Poetry Class '96 − Flashlight

References

Living people
People from Chicago
American rock guitarists
American male guitarists
American rock songwriters
American rock singers
American indie rock musicians
Singer-songwriters from Illinois
Guitarists from Chicago
Year of birth missing (living people)
American male singer-songwriters